The 2004 College Nationals was the 9th Women's College Nationals. The College Nationals was a team handball tournament to determined the College National Champion from 2004 from the US.

Venues 
The championship was played at three venues at the University of North Carolina in Chapel Hill, North Carolina.

Modus 

The five teams and one adult teams were split in two groups each team played two round robins. Rock THB was automatically ranked last.

The two first teams from each group played the semis.

The last of group A played against Rock THB.

The losers of the semis play a small final.

The winners of the semis play the final.

Results 
Source:

Group stage

Group A

Group B

Championship

Semifinals

Small Final

Final

Consolation 5-6th Place

Final ranking 
Source:

Awards 
Source:

Top scorers 

Source:

All-Tournament Team 
Source:

References

External links 
 Tournament Results archived
 Image Page archived

USA Team Handball College Nationals by year
North Carolina Tar Heels team handball